Facundo Federico Waller Martiarena (born 9 April 1997) is a Uruguayan professional footballer who plays as a midfielder for Liga MX club Puebla.

Club career
A youth academy graduate of Plaza Colonia, Waller made his professional debut on 19 April 2014 in a 1–1 draw against Rocha. He scored his first goal on 19 March 2017 in a 2–3 defeat against Sud América.

In February 2018, Waller joined Nacional on a season long loan deal. However, he couldn't play any matches for the senior team due to injuries.

On 13 August 2020, Liga MX club UNAM announced the signing of Waller on a season long loan deal with option to buy. In April 2021, UNAM decided not to activate his purchase option and announced his departure from the club.

On 10 July 2021, Waller joined Atlético San Luis on a two-year deal.

International career
Waller is a former Uruguayan youth international. He was part of under-20 team squad which won 2017 South American U-20 Championship and reached semi-finals of 2017 FIFA U-20 World Cup.

Waller was part of under-22 team which reached semi-finals at 2019 Pan American Games. Later that year, he was named in 23-man final squad for 2020 CONMEBOL Pre-Olympic Tournament.

Honours
Individual
 Uruguayan Primera División Team of the Year: 2019

References

External links
 

1997 births
Living people
Uruguayan people of German descent
People from Colonia del Sacramento
Association football midfielders
Uruguayan footballers
Uruguay under-20 international footballers
Uruguayan Primera División players
Liga MX players
Plaza Colonia players
Club Universidad Nacional footballers
Atlético San Luis footballers
Uruguayan expatriate footballers
Uruguayan expatriate sportspeople in Mexico
Expatriate footballers in Mexico